Caroline Hunt Rimmer (1851–1918) was an American illustrator, sculptor and teacher. She was active in Belmont and Boston, Massachusetts.

Biography 
Caroline Hunt Rimmer born in 1851 in Randolph, Massachusetts, the daughter of Mary H. C. Rimmer and William Rimmer. She studied art with her father.

She wrote Figure Drawing for Children, originally published in 1893, republished as recently as 2013.

Rimmer's sculpture, Mermaid is in Boston's Museum of Fine Arts collection.

She died in Boston, Massachusetts.

References

1851 births
1918 deaths
19th-century American sculptors
American women sculptors
Sculptors from Massachusetts
19th-century American women artists
American women illustrators
American illustrators
People from Randolph, Massachusetts
American people of French descent
Artists from Boston
People from Belmont, Massachusetts